The Gallic epoch is an obsolete epoch of the Mesozoic Era's Cretaceous, the latter being a geologic period and system that spans 79 million years from the end of the Jurassic Period  million years ago (mya) to the beginning of the Paleogene Period  mya. The Gallic epoch encompasses the Barremian, Aptian, Albian, Cenomanian and Turonian faunal stages.

In the system of the International Commission on Stratigraphy, the Gallic corresponds to the later part of the Early Cretaceous epoch and the early part of the Late Cretaceous.

See also 
 List of geochronologic names

Cretaceous geochronology